The UEFA Euro 2016 qualifying Group H was one of the nine groups to decide which teams would qualify for the UEFA Euro 2016 finals tournament. Group H consisted of six teams: Italy, Croatia, Norway, Bulgaria, Azerbaijan, and Malta, where they played against each other home-and-away in a round-robin format.

The top two teams, Italy and Croatia, qualified directly for the finals. As third-placed Norway weren't the highest-ranked among all third-placed teams, they advanced to the play-offs, where they lost to Hungary and thus failed to qualify.

Standings

Matches 

The fixtures were released by UEFA the same day as the draw, which was held on 23 February 2014 in Nice. Times are CET/CEST, as listed by UEFA (local times are in parentheses).

Goalscorers

Discipline 
A player was automatically suspended for the next match for the following offences:
 Receiving a red card (red card suspensions could be extended for serious offences)
 Receiving three yellow cards in three different matches, as well as after fifth and any subsequent yellow card (yellow card suspensions were carried forward to the play-offs, but not the finals or any other future international matches)
The following suspensions were served during the qualifying matches:

Notes

References

External links 
UEFA Euro 2016 qualifying round Group H

Group H
2014–15 in Italian football
Q
2014–15 in Croatian football
Q
2014–15 in Azerbaijani football
2015–16 in Azerbaijani football
2014–15 in Maltese football
2015–16 in Maltese football
2014–15 in Bulgarian football
2015–16 in Bulgarian football
2014 in Norwegian football
2015 in Norwegian football